OutDaughtered is an American reality series on TLC starring Adam and Danielle Busby, parents of the only American all-girl quintuplets on record. The series debuted on May 10, 2016 and premiered its eighth season on February 23, 2021.

Synopsis
The Busby family consists of Adam  and Danielle Busby, who have been married since 2006; eldest daughter Blayke Louise; and quintuplets Ava Lane, Olivia Marie, Hazel Grace, Riley Paige, and Parker Kate. 

Adam and Danielle had struggled with infertility, ultimately becoming pregnant both times by intrauterine insemination.

Danielle delivered the quintuplets via Caesarean section 28 weeks into the pregnancy. Shortly after birth, heart murmurs were detected in all five girls; this was treated with medication. The quints spent the first eight to twelve weeks of their lives in the neonatal intensive care unit at the Woman's Hospital of Texas, before being released to go home between June and July 2015.

Hazel's eye condition, congenital nystagmus, has been chronicled through the series. The condition causes Hazel to have uncontrolled eye movements and hold her head at unusual angles to compensate for her lack of clear vision. In 2016, Hazel underwent eye surgery in an attempt to improve her condition. In 2017, Hazel was diagnosed as having an astigmatism in her left eye, which may ultimately be responsible for it occasionally turning in as a result of being underdeveloped. She was prescribed glasses to help with her left eye farsightedness with the hope that her vision will improve as her eye develops.

Adam has opened up, both privately and publicly, about his struggle with postpartum depression.

Episodes

Series overview

Season 1 (2016)

Season 2 (2016–17)

Season 3 (2017)

Season 4 (2018)

Season 5 (2019)

Season 6 (2019)

Season 7 (2020)

Season 8 (2021)

Specials

References

External links

2010s American reality television series
2016 American television series debuts
Quintuplets
Television series about children
Television series about families
TLC (TV network) original programming